The International Peace Research Association is a global network of academics. It was founded in 1964 and promotes peace by supporting national organizations, hosting conferences, publishing and supporting the publication of peace-promoting journals.

Organization 
The International Peace Research Association was founded in 1964 and is a global network of educators and researchers who collaborate on peace-building activities.

The association encourages national and international peace-building education and supports the dissemination of peace-promoting research.

The 2021-2023 co-secretaries generals are Christine Atieno and Matt Meyer.

Activities 
The association organizes a biannual conference, sponsors peace journals, and publishes a newsletter.

In 1973, it formed the Peace Education Commission, that identifies and describes the work of International Peace Research Association members.

See also 

 Asia-Pacific Peace Research Association (affiliate)
 Peace and Justice Studies Association (affiliate)

References 

1964 establishments
Peace organizations